The 11th Pan American Games were held in Havana, Cuba from August 2 to August 18, 1991.

Medals

Silver

Women's Half Heavyweight (– 72 kg): María Cangá

Bronze

Men's 50 m Rifle Prone: Hugo Romero

Results by event

See also
 Ecuador at the 1992 Summer Olympics

References
 Ecuadorian Olympic Committee

Nations at the 1991 Pan American Games
Pan American Games
1991